Lichenostigma rupicolae is a species of lichenicolous fungus belonging to the family Phaeococcomycetaceae.

It was described in 2010 from specimens of Pertusaria rupicola, its host species.

References

Arthoniomycetes
Fungi described in 2010
Fungi of Europe
Fungi of Turkey
Lichenicolous fungi